Oliver Wellington "Billy" Sipple (November 20, 1941 – late January 1989) was an American man known for intervening to prevent an assassination attempt against U.S. President Gerald Ford on September 22, 1975. A decorated U.S. Marine and disabled Vietnam War veteran, he grappled with Sara Jane Moore as she fired a pistol at Ford in San Francisco, causing her to miss. The subsequent public revelation that Sipple was gay turned the news story into a cause célèbre for LGBT rights activists, leading Sipple to  sue — unsuccessfully — several publishers for invasion of privacy, and causing his estrangement from his parents.

Early life
Sipple was born in Detroit, Michigan. He served in the United States Marine Corps and fought in Vietnam. Shrapnel wounds suffered in December 1968 caused him to finish out his second tour of duty in a Philadelphia veterans' hospital, from which he was released in March 1970. Sipple, who was closeted in his hometown of Detroit, had met Harvey Milk in New York City and had participated in San Francisco's gay pride parades and gay rights demonstrations. Sipple was active in local causes, including the historic political campaigns of openly gay Board of Supervisors candidate Milk. The two were friends and Sipple would also be later described as a "prominent figure" in the gay community who had worked in a gay bar and was active in the Imperial Court System.

He lived with a merchant seaman in a fourth-floor walk-up apartment located in San Francisco's Mission District. He later spent six months in San Francisco's VA hospital, and was frequently readmitted into the hospital in 1975, the year he saved Ford's life.

Ford assassination attempt

Sipple was part of a crowd of about 3,000 people who had gathered outside San Francisco's St. Francis Hotel to see President Ford on September 22, 1975. Ford, just emerging from the building, was vulnerable despite heavy security protection. Standing beside Sipple in the crowd was Sara Jane Moore. She was about 40 feet (12 m) away from Ford when she fired a single shot at him with a .38 revolver, narrowly missing the President. After realizing she had missed, she raised her arm again, and Sipple dove towards her; he grabbed her arm, possibly saving Ford's life. Sipple said at the time, "I saw [her gun] pointed out there and I grabbed for it. ... I lunged and grabbed the woman's arm and the gun went off." The bullet ricocheted and hit John Ludwig, a 42-year-old taxi driver; he survived. The incident came just three weeks after Lynette Fromme's assassination attempt on Ford. Reporters hounded Sipple, who at first did not want his name used, nor his location known.

Aftermath
The police and the Secret Service immediately commended Sipple for his action at the scene, as did the media. The national news media portrayed Sipple as a hero, and noted his status as a former Marine.

Though he was known to be gay among members of the San Francisco gay community, and had even participated in gay pride events, Sipple's sexual orientation was a secret from his family. He asked the press to keep such personal information off the record, making it clear that neither his mother nor his employer knew he was gay.

The day after the incident, two answering machine messages outed Sipple to San Francisco Chronicle columnist Herb Caen. One was from Reverend Ray Broshears, the head of a gay activist group called the Lavender Panthers. The other message was from local gay activist Harvey Milk, a friend of Sipple and on whose campaign for city council Sipple had worked. While discussing whether Sipple's sexuality should be disclosed, Milk told a friend, "It's too good an opportunity. For once we can show that gays do heroic things, not just all that caca about molesting children and hanging out in bathrooms." Milk outed Sipple in order to portray him as a "gay hero" and so to "break the stereotype of homosexuals" being "timid, weak and unheroic figures". According to historian Harold Evans, "[T]here was no invitation to the White House for Sipple, not even a commendation. Milk made a fuss about that. Finally, weeks later, Sipple received a brief note of thanks." Three days after the incident, Sipple received a letter from President Ford. It read:

Two days after the thwarted assassination attempt, unable to reach Sipple, Caen wrote of Sipple as a gay man, and of a friend of Milk, speculating Ford offered praise "quietly" because of Sipple's sexual orientation. Sipple was besieged by reporters, as was his family. His mother refused to speak to him. Gay liberation groups petitioned local media to give Sipple his due as a hero. Caen published the private side of the Sipple's story, as did a handful of other publications. Sipple then insisted to reporters that his sexuality be kept confidential. Reporters labeled Sipple the "gay ex-Marine", and his mother disparaged and disowned him. Later, when Sipple hid in a friend's apartment to avoid reporters, they turned to Milk, arguably the most visible voice for the gay community. Of President Ford's letter of thanks to Sipple, Milk suggested that Sipple's sexual orientation was the reason he received only a note, rather than an invitation to the White House.

Sipple sued the Chronicle, filing a $15-million invasion of privacy suit against Caen, seven named newspapers, and a number of unnamed publishers, for publishing the disclosures. The Superior Court in San Francisco dismissed the suit, and Sipple continued his legal battle until May 1984, when a state court of appeals held that Sipple had indeed become news, and that his sexual orientation was part of the story.

Later years and death

According to a 2006 article in The Washington Post, Sipple went through a period of estrangement with his parents, but the family later reconciled with him. Sipple's brother, George, told the newspaper, "[Our parents] accepted it. That was all. They didn't like it, but they still accepted. He was welcomed. Only thing was: Don't bring a lot of your friends." However, other sources indicate that Sipple's parents never fully accepted him. His mother, just after news broke of Sipple's sexual orientation, hung up on Sipple, saying she never wished to speak to him again. His father is said to have told Sipple's brother to "forget [he had] a brother." Finally, when his mother died, his father did not allow him to attend her funeral.
Although deemed 100% Disabled by the USVA, prior to thwarting the attempt, Sipple did not have a history of alcohol abuse and maintained his physical fitness (the best he could) as proven by his clearing the crowd and covering the 12-metre distance before grabbing the shooter’s arm after she took aim again and fired another round. Sipple’s action caused her to miss President Ford, and he denied her more attempts as he restrained her until USSS agents arrived. Sipple's mental and physical health sharply declined over the years. He drank heavily, was diagnosed with schizophrenia, fitted with a pacemaker, and gained weight. The incident brought him so much attention that, later in life, while drinking, he would express regret about grabbing Moore's gun. On February 2, 1989, an acquaintance, Wayne Friday, found Sipple dead in his San Francisco apartment, with a bottle of Jack Daniel's next to him and the television still on. The San Francisco coroner estimated Sipple had been dead for approximately 10 days. He was 47 years old. Ford and his wife sent a letter of sympathy to Sipple's family and friends. He was buried in Golden Gate National Cemetery south of San Francisco.

Sipple's $334-per-month apartment near San Francisco's Tenderloin District was found with many newspaper clippings of his actions, including a framed letter from the White House. A letter addressed to the friends of Sipple was on display for a short period after his death at the New Belle Saloon:

In a 2001 interview with columnist Deb Price, Ford disputed the claim that Sipple was treated differently because of his sexual orientation, saying,

Legacy
According to Castañeda and Campbell:

A September 2017 episode of the radio program Radiolab covered Sipple's foiling the assassination of then President Ford. The episode goes into Sipple's act of heroism, his outing by Harvey Milk and Herb Caen and the news media, and the ethics of his outing in spite of his opposition.

See also
 List of United States presidential assassination attempts and plots

References

External links
 American Century article
 Oliver Sipple Saves President Ford's Life
 
 

1941 births
1989 deaths
American LGBT military personnel
United States Marine Corps personnel of the Vietnam War
Burials at Golden Gate National Cemetery
Gay military personnel
Gerald Ford
Harvey Milk
LGBT people from California
LGBT people from Michigan
Military personnel from Michigan
People from Detroit
People from San Francisco
People with schizophrenia
United States Marines